I Love the '70s is a television nostalgia series produced by the BBC that examines the pop culture of the 1970s. It was broadcast in ten hour-long episodes, one dedicated to each year, with the first episode, I Love 1970, premiering on BBC Two on 22 July 2000, and the last, I Love 1979, premiering on 23 September 2000. On the original broadcasts, each episode was followed by the host introducing a film from that particular year. Repeat editions have often been edited down in length by featuring less items, typically to half an hour runtime.

The series proved successful and thus was followed by two similar series, I Love the '80s and I Love the '90s, both of which aired during 2001.

The "I Love..."-series spawned a U.S. version, aired by VH1. Part of the series was repeated in the spring of 2012 on BBC Two as part of a special season dedicated to the 1970s.

The episode 'I Love 1975" is the only episode that was interrupted due to a power failure on 30 June 2001, and as concluded as part of the years that BBC Two suffered problems (2000, 2001, and 2003).

Topics covered by year

1970
Host: Jimmy Savile. Opening titles: "Band of Gold" by Freda Payne.

 Clangers (children's animated TV series)
 Kes (film)
 M*A*S*H (film)
 Scooby-Doo, Where Are You! (children's animated TV series)
 The Goodies (TV comedy series)
 The Railway Children
 Raleigh Chopper (bicycle which was a popular choice for teenagers and children)
 Dubreq Stylophone
 1970 FIFA World Cup (the England football team entered the World Cup as defending champions but failed to retain the trophy)
 Midiskirt/maxiskirt
 Triumph Stag (a stylish and iconic sports car built by British Leyland, launched in the summer of 1970)
 The Beatles break-up
 Diana Ross leaves The Supremes
 Simon and Garfunkel break-up
 The Jackson 5

PIF of 1970: Joe & Petunia

Flashback Commercial of 1970: Cresta – Singing Polar Bear (actually aired in 1972)

Note: Subsequent repeats of this episode did not feature Scooby-Doo, Where Are You, due to clearance rights only covering the original transmission of the episode.

Note: As a result of the 2012 revelations about Jimmy Saville's history of sexual abuse, this edition is very seldom repeated.

1971
Host: Britt Ekland
Get Carter (film)
The Banana Splits (animated/live action children's TV series)
Shaft (film)
The Liver Birds (TV sitcom)
Space Hopper
Clackers (metal toy best described as resembling conkers) 
Novelty Songs
"Ernie (The Fastest Milkman In The West)"
"Chirpy Chirpy Cheep Cheep"
Middle of the Road
Harvey Smith (equestrian)
Decimal Day (British currency switch)
Crossfire (board game)
Corgi Toys (miniature toy cars for children)
Jackie Stewart (racing driver)
Hot pants

1972

Host: David Cassidy
 Cabaret (film musical)
 Love Thy Neighbour (TV sitcom)
 Magpie (ITV rival to Blue Peter)
 Cosmopolitan (women's magazine)
 The Joy of Sex (sex manual)
 David Cassidy & Donny Osmond
 Sweets
 The New Seekers
 Action Man (children's toy)
 Roller Skates
 Mark Spitz (Olympic swimmer)
 The Harlem Globetrotters (sports team)
 Marc Bolan (lead singer of T-Rex)

PIF of 1972: Learn to Swim

1973

Host: Noddy Holder
Kojak (TV police series)
Man About the House (TV sitcom)
Slade (British glam rock group fronted by Noddy Holder)
Bruce Lee
Mastermind (board game)
Sweet
Mike Yarwood (impressionist)
The England football team's failure to qualify for the 1974 World Cup (just eight years after winning the trophy)
Uri Geller (Israeli illusionist)

Flashback Commercial of 1973: Vymura Wallpaper

Note: This edition acted as the original pilot for the series, originally serving as an in-house demonstration of how a typical episode would run, and as such features Noddy Holder in a 'typical 1973 home'. Although the idea of each edition reflecting a different household in each year was dropped in favour of a different relevant scenario for each year, the house setting was later revived for BBC Two's Back in Time for... series.

1974

Host: Roobarb & Custard. Opening titles: "You Ain't Seen Nothing Yet" by Bachman Turner Overdrive.
Blazing Saddles (film)
It Ain't Half Hot Mum (TV sitcom)
Roobarb (animated TV series)
The Bionic Woman (TV series first screened in 1976)
The Six Million Dollar Man (TV series)
The Wombles (stop-motion children's animated TV series, also the name of a related pop group)
Mud
Alvin Stardust
Super Noodles
Angel Delight (dessert)
Vesta (Ready Meals)
Slimcea bread
John Conteh
Pong (early video game)
Videocassette recorders
Package holidays
Ford Capri (popular British sports car which entered its second generation in 1974)
Pan's People (dancing troupe on Top of the Pops)

1975

Host: Dennis Waterman

Happy Days (TV comedy series)
Jaws (film)
Jim'll Fix It (TV series)
The Rocky Horror Picture Show (film)
Starsky & Hutch (TV series)
The Sweeney (TV series)
World of Sport – Saturday Afternoon Wrestling feature
Barry Sheene
Bay City Rollers
David Essex

1976
Host: Kermit the Frog. Opening titles: "Dancing Queen" by ABBA. Ending credits: "Young Hearts Run Free" by Candi Staton.
"Convoy" (chart hit) 
The Muppet Show
Long hot summer
Ice Lollies
Björn Borg (tennis player)
Tina Charles
ABBA
Brotherhood of Man
Lip gloss
Punk fashion
Peter Powell (kite)
Citizens' band radio

1977

Host: Carrie Fisher. Opening titles: "Star Wars Theme" by Meco.

Star Wars (film)
Saturday Night Fever (film)
Take Hart (children's art series)
The Professionals (drama series)
Skateboard
Blue Jeans magazine
Pot Noodle
Queen Elizabeth II's Silver Jubilee (which was marked by widespread public celebrations)
The Sex Pistols
Space Dust

1978

Host: Lynda Carter. Opening credits: "Blame It On the Boogie" by The Jacksons. Ending credits: "Teenage Kicks" by The Undertones.

 Blake's 7 (TV science fiction)
 Grease (film)
 The Incredible Hulk (TV series)
 Wonder Woman (TV series)
 The Boomtown Rats (punk rock band)
 Soda Stream
 Kate Bush (female vocalist who achieved her first major chart hits in 1978)
 Top Trumps (popular card game)
 Simon
 Hot Gossip (dancing troupe)
 Space Invaders (one of the first popular computer games)
 Dean Friedman

Flashback Commercial of 1978: Glenryck Pilchards

1979

Host: Bo Derek. Opening credits: Pop Muzik by M. Ending credits: After the Love Has Gone by Earth, Wind and Fire.

10 (film)
Monkey (TV series)
Quadrophenia (film)
The Dukes of Hazzard (TV series)
Hot Gossip
Holly Hobbie
Picture & coloured vinyl discs
Gary Numan
Ska
Madness
The election of Margaret Thatcher (Britain's first female prime minister)

Flashback Commercial of 1979: Barbie

References

External links
 

2000 British television series debuts
2000 British television series endings
BBC Television shows
Jimmy Savile
English-language television shows
Nostalgia television shows